Whitehall Apartments is a historic apartment building located at Haverford in Lower Merion Township, Montgomery County, Pennsylvania.  It was built in 1925–1926, and is a large, 3 1/2-story, "E"-shaped stucco building in the Mission Revival style.  It features wrought iron balconies, blue decorative tile featuring scenes of Christopher Columbus, and red tile roof caps.

It was added to the National Register of Historic Places in 1983.

References

Residential buildings on the National Register of Historic Places in Pennsylvania
Residential buildings completed in 1926
Buildings and structures in Montgomery County, Pennsylvania
Apartment buildings in Pennsylvania
National Register of Historic Places in Montgomery County, Pennsylvania